The Ashkelon Subdistrict is the northern of the two sub-districts in Israel's Southern District. Its population is more than half a million. It is an important region for manufacturing including electricity production and water desalination, agriculture, transportation, tourism, and trade.

Ashdod is the largest city in the subdistrict. The capital of the subdistrict, Ashkelon, is its second-largest city. Both are on the Mediterranean Sea. The other cities in the subdistrict, Kiryat Malakhi, Kiryat Gat, and Sderot, are smaller and located inland.

The subdistrict borders clockwise with the Rehovot Subdistrict in the north, the Jerusalem District and the West Bank in the east, the Beersheba Subdistrict in the south, and the Gaza Strip and the Mediterranean Sea in the west.

History 
During the British Mandate of Palestine, parts of the present-day subdistrict were in the Gaza, Hebron, and Beersheba subdistricts.

Transportation 
The Israel Trail leads through the east of the subdistrict, generally in a north-south direction.

Roads 
The subdistrict has 3 major north-south routes: 
 Road 4 from Ashdod through Ashkelon to the Yad Mordechai Junction, from where most traffic continues over Road 34 to Sderot and Netivot (outside the subdistrict).
 Road 40 between Gedera (just outside the subdistrict), Kiryat Malakhi, and Kiryat Gat, connecting to Road 6 at the Maahaz Interchange
 Road 6 on the east side of the subdistrict.

Its 2 major east-west thoroughfares are: 
 Road 3, connecting Kiryat Malakhi to Ashkelon.
 Road 35, between Road 6, Kiryat Gat, and Ashkelon.

Rail 
Kiryat Malakhi, through a quite remote railway station, and Kiryat Gat are on the north-south railroad from Tel Aviv to Beersheba. Beersheba also has a rail connection through Ofakim and Netivot to Sderot, from where the line continues north to Ashkelon and Ashdod. Ashdod, in turn, has railway connections outside the subdistrict to Tel Aviv and Lod.

The east-west Heletz railway, between Kiryat Gat and Ashkelon, serves only freight. It was completed in 1985. Other freight tracks connect to the Port of Ashdod and to Rutenberg Power Station. Ashkelon has major maintenance facilities of Israel railways.

Sea 
The subdistrict has a major seaport in Ashdod. Ashkelon has sea terminals for coal and oil. 

Ashdod has two yacht harbors and Ashkelon has one.

References